Tadpole is the third and final studio album by New Zealand rock band Tadpole. It was released on May 2, 2006.

This was the last album recorded by the band before they split up. The album's launch party in Auckland was also the band's final live performance.

Track listing

References

2006 albums
Tadpole (band) albums